Core periphery structure is a network theory model.

Models of core–periphery structures
There are two main intuitions behind the definition of core–periphery network structures; one assumes that a network can only have one core, whereas the other allows for the possibility of multiple cores. These two intuitive conceptions serve as the basis for two modes of core–periphery structures.

Discrete model
This model assumes that there are two classes of nodes. The first consists of a cohesive core sub-graph in which the nodes are highly interconnected, and the second is made up of a peripheral set of nodes that is loosely connected to the core. In an ideal core–periphery matrix, core nodes are adjacent to other core nodes and to some peripheral nodes while peripheral nodes are not connected with other peripheral nodes (Borgatti & Everett, 2000, p. 378). This requires, however, that there be an a priori partition that indicates whether a node belongs to the core or periphery.

Continuous model
This model allows for the existence of three or more partitions of node classes. However, including more classes makes modifications to the discrete model more difficult. Borgatti & Everett (1999) suggest that, in order to overcome this problem, each node be assigned a measure of ‘coreness’ that will determine its class. Nevertheless, the threshold of what constitutes a high ‘coreness’ value must be justified theoretically.

Discussion
Hubs are commonly found in empirical networks and pose a problem for community detection as they usually have strong ties to many communities. Identifying core–periphery structures can help circumvent this problem by categorizing hubs as part of the network's core (Rombach et al., 2014, p. 160). Likewise, though all core nodes have high centrality measures, not all nodes with high centrality measures belong to the core. It is possible to find that a set of highly central nodes in a graph does not make an internally cohesive subgraph (Borgatti & Everett, 2000)...

Uses in economics
The concept of center and periphery was first introduced by Raúl Prebisch in the 1950s. However, the qualitative notion that social networks can have a core–periphery structure has a long history in disciplines such as sociology, international relations (Nemeth & Smith, 1985), and economics (Snyder & Kick, 1979). Observed trade flows and diplomatic ties among countries fit this structure. Paul Krugman (1991) suggests that when transportation costs are low enough manufacturers concentrate in a single region known as the core and other regions (the periphery) limit themselves to the supply of agricultural goods.

See also
Core countries
Semi-periphery countries
Periphery countries
Degeneracy (graph theory)

References

 Borgatti, S. P., & Everett, M. G. (1999). Models of core /periphery structures. Social Networks, 21, 375–395. doi:10.1016/S0378-8733(99)00019-2
 Krugman, P.R. (1991), Increasing returns and economic geography, Journal of Political Economy 99, 483–499.
 Nemeth, R. J., & Smith, D. A. (1985). International trade and world-system structure: A multiple network analysis (No. 8).
 Rombach, M. P., Porter, M. A., Fowler, J. H., & Mucha, P. J. (2014). Core–periphery structure in Networks. SIAM J. Appl. Math., 74(1), 167–190.
 Snyder, D., & Kick, E. L. (1979). Structural position in the world system and economic growth, 1955–1970: A multiple-network analysis of transnational interactions. American Journal of Sociology, 84, 1096–1126.
 Wallerstein, I. (1978). World-system analysis: theoretical and interpretative issues. World-System Analysis: Theory and Methodology, 91-103.
 Zhang, X., Martin, T., & Newman, M. E. J. (n.d.). Identification of core–periphery structure in networks, 1–10.

Network theory